Webuye West is a constituency in Kenya. It is one of nine constituencies in Bungoma County.

Member of Parliament

References 

Constituencies in Bungoma County